Juanda Station (station code: JUA) is a railway station located in Kebon Kelapa, Gambir, Central Jakarta, Jakarta, Indonesia. Since Gambir station stopped serving Commuterline trains, Juanda, along, with Gondangdia station, has become the alternative for passengers going to Merdeka Square and the surrounding areas.

The station got its name from the nearby road, which in turn is named after Djuanda Kartawidjaja, the 11th and final Prime Minister of Indonesia.

KAI Commuter, a subsidiary of Kereta Api Indonesia, has their main office in the northern part of the station.

Juanda station is connected to the Juanda TransJakarta bus station and the Istiqlal Mosque by a pedestrian bridge.

History 

This station is a train station located on the first section of the Batavia–Buitenzorg railway line which was inaugurated by the Nederlandsch-Indische Spoorweg Maatschappij (NIS), namely the Batavia–Weltevreden section. At first, this station was a small stop which was inaugurated on 15 September 1871, simultaneously with the opening of the first section of the railroad line.  This station was named Noordwijk Station which later changed its name to Pintoe-air Station (Pintu Air Station after the enactment of the Republican Spelling System) during the Japanese occupation of Indonesia.

In the 1990s, Pintu Air Station was massively reconstructed into an elevated station. The remodeled station was inaugurated as one of the Manggarai–Jakarta Kota elevated stations on 5 June 1992, along with a name change to Juanda Station. At the time, President Suharto along with his wife Siti Hartinah and other ranks in the government inaugurated the elevated railway by taking the electric train from Gambir Station to  Station.

Building and layout 
The Juanda Station building has a modern design with a touch of azure panels which are still maintained to this day and have never been painted, only the pillars of the platform have been changed to pale blue, before finally repainting to azure in 2022. It is known that the project, which began in February 1988, spent Rp. 432.5 billion and at the time it was inaugurated was not fully completed until it was fully operational a year later.

This station has two railway lines.

Services 
The following is a list of train services at the Juanda Station.

Passenger services 
 KAI Commuter

Supporting transportation

Incidents 

 On October 26, 2008, at 15.30 WIB, the pantograph which was located in Car 1 of the KRL Jakarta Kota-Bogor route was caught on fire. As a result of this incident, a number of KRL trips were hampered. There were no casualties in this incident.
 On September 11, 2009, there was a power outage at Juanda Station, causing a number of KRL trips to be disrupted for 15–20 minutes.
 On October 3, 2009, at 09.50 WIB, the Jakarta Kota-Bogor Economy class KRL train was rammed by a locomotive at Juanda Station. This incident did not result in delays in train travel, but a 10-year-old homeless girl suffered a fracture of her right leg.
 On September 23, 2015, at 15.25 WIB, the 2015 Juanda Train Tragedy occurred which involved two KRL JR 205 SF 10 at Juanda Station. Both front train driver's cabins were badly damaged.  Forty-two people were injured as a result of the accident. This incident resulted in the KRL 1156 driver, Gustian, being seriously injured and rushed to the Gatot Soebroto Army Central Hospital, Central Jakarta.

Gallery

References 

Central Jakarta
Railway stations in Jakarta